Arakht is a village in Badakhshan Province in north-eastern Afghanistan.

It is located between Lake Shiva and the Panj River, at an elevation of  near the Tajikistan border.

Climate
Arakht has a subarctic climate (Köppen climate classification: Dsc) with mild, dry summers and very cold, snowy winters.

References

External links
Satellite map at Maplandia.com

Populated places in Shighnan District